Harmony Township is a township located in Warren County in the U.S. state of New Jersey. As of the 2020 United States census, the township's population was 2,503, a decrease of 164 (−6.1%) from the 2010 census count of 2,667, which in turn reflected a decline of 62 (−2.3%) from the 2,729 counted in the 2000 census. 

Harmony was incorporated as a township by an act of the New Jersey Legislature on April 8, 1839, from portions of Greenwich Township and Oxford Township, based on the results of a referendum held that day. Phillipsburg Township was created March 7, 1851, from portions of the township. The township was named for Harmon Shipman, an early settler.

Geography
According to the U.S. Census Bureau, Harmony township had a total area of 24.13 square miles (62.49 km2), including 23.75 square miles (61.51 km2) of land and 0.38 square miles (0.98 km2) of water (1.56%).

With a 2010 population of 202, Brainards), Harmony CDP (441), and Hutchinson (135) are unincorporated communities and census-designated places (CDPs) located within the township.

Other unincorporated communities, localities and place names located partially or completely within the township include Allens Mills, Harmony Station, Lower Harmony, Martins Creek Station, Montana and Roxburg.

The township borders the Warren County municipalities of Franklin Township, Lopatcong Township and White Township.

Demographics

The township's economic data, like all of Warren County, is calculated by the U.S. Census Bureau as part of the Allentown-Bethlehem-Easton, PA-NJ Metropolitan Statistical Area.

2010 census
 The Census Bureau's 2006–2010 American Community Survey showed that (in 2010 inflation-adjusted dollars) median household income was $82,339 (with a margin of error of +/− $7,992) and the median family income was $86,964 (+/− $11,141). Males had a median income of $60,489 (+/− $4,798) versus $53,100 (+/− $11,618) for females. The per capita income for the borough was $34,985 (+/− $4,062). About 0.7% of families and 1.2% of the population were below the poverty line, including 0.5% of those under age 18 and 1.7% of those age 65 or over.

2000 census
As of the 2000 United States census there were 2,729 people, 1,010 households, and 786 families residing in the township. The population density was 114.6 people per square mile (44.3/km2). There were 1,076 housing units at an average density of 45.2 per square mile (17.4/km2). The racial makeup of the township was 97.91% White, 0.70% African American, 0.07% Native American, 0.40% Asian, 0.18% from other races, and 0.73% from two or more races. Hispanic or Latino of any race were 1.28% of the population.

There were 1,010 households, out of which 34.2% had children under the age of 18 living with them, 66.3% were married couples living together, 7.7% had a female householder with no husband present, and 22.1% were non-families. 17.8% of all households were made up of individuals, and 8.5% had someone living alone who was 65 years of age or older. The average household size was 2.68 and the average family size was 3.05.

In the township, the population was spread out, with 24.1% under the age of 18, 5.2% from 18 to 24, 30.6% from 25 to 44, 26.2% from 45 to 64, and 13.9% who were 65 years of age or older. The median age was 40 years. For every 100 females, there were 97.8 males. For every 100 females age 18 and over, there were 97.2 males.

The median income for a household in the township was $60,977, and the median income for a family was $64,196. Males had a median income of $49,375 versus $28,750 for females. The per capita income for the township was $25,776. About 2.8% of families and 4.5% of the population were below the poverty line, including 3.9% of those under age 18 and 5.3% of those age 65 or over.

Government

Local government 
Harmony Township is governed under the Township form of New Jersey municipal government, one of 141 municipalities (of the 564) statewide that use this form, the second-most commonly used form of government in the state. The governing body is comprised of a three-member Township Committee, whose members are elected directly by the voters at-large in partisan elections to serve three-year terms of office on a staggered basis, with one seat coming up for election each year as part of the November general election in a three-year cycle. At an annual reorganization meeting, the Township Committee selects one of its members to serve as Mayor.

, members of the Harmony Township Committee are Mayor Brian R. Tipton (R, term on committee ends December 31, 2024; term as mayor ends 2022), Deputy Mayor Diane Yamrock (R, term on committee ends 2023; term as deputy mayor ends 2022) and Richard T. Cornely (R, 2022).

Federal, state, and county representation 
Harmony Township is located in the 7th Congressional District and is part of New Jersey's 23rd state legislative district.

Politics
As of March 2011, there were a total of 1,802 registered voters in Harmony Township, of which 333 (18.5% vs. 21.5% countywide) were registered as Democrats, 786 (43.6% vs. 35.3%) were registered as Republicans and 683 (37.9% vs. 43.1%) were registered as Unaffiliated. There were no voters registered to other parties. Among the township's 2010 Census population, 67.6% (vs. 62.3% in Warren County) were registered to vote, including 85.5% of those ages 18 and over (vs. 81.5% countywide).

In the 2012 presidential election, Republican Mitt Romney received 702 votes (58.9% vs. 56.0% countywide), ahead of Democrat Barack Obama with 442 votes (37.1% vs. 40.8%) and other candidates with 24 votes (2.0% vs. 1.7%), among the 1,192 ballots cast by the township's 1,826 registered voters, for a turnout of 65.3% (vs. 66.7% in Warren County). In the 2008 presidential election, Republican John McCain received 805 votes (59.9% vs. 55.2% countywide), ahead of Democrat Barack Obama with 486 votes (36.1% vs. 41.4%) and other candidates with 33 votes (2.5% vs. 1.6%), among the 1,345 ballots cast by the township's 1,824 registered voters, for a turnout of 73.7% (vs. 73.4% in Warren County). In the 2004 presidential election, Republican George W. Bush received 798 votes (61.6% vs. 61.0% countywide), ahead of Democrat John Kerry with 479 votes (37.0% vs. 37.2%) and other candidates with 14 votes (1.1% vs. 1.3%), among the 1,296 ballots cast by the township's 1,713 registered voters, for a turnout of 75.7% (vs. 76.3% in the whole county).

In the 2013 gubernatorial election, Republican Chris Christie received 75.9% of the vote (536 cast), ahead of Democrat Barbara Buono with 21.4% (151 votes), and other candidates with 2.7% (19 votes), among the 717 ballots cast by the township's 1,844 registered voters (11 ballots were spoiled), for a turnout of 38.9%. In the 2009 gubernatorial election, Republican Chris Christie received 543 votes (63.7% vs. 61.3% countywide), ahead of Democrat Jon Corzine with 197 votes (23.1% vs. 25.7%), Independent Chris Daggett with 84 votes (9.9% vs. 9.8%) and other candidates with 11 votes (1.3% vs. 1.5%), among the 852 ballots cast by the township's 1,800 registered voters, yielding a 47.3% turnout (vs. 49.6% in the county).

Education
The Harmony Township School District serves students in public school for pre-kindergarten through eighth grade at Harmony Township School. As of the 2021–22 school year, the district, comprised of one school, had an enrollment of 200 students and 30.0 classroom teachers (on an FTE basis), for a student–teacher ratio of 6.7:1.

Public school students in ninth through twelfth grades attend Belvidere High School, together with students from Hope Township and White Township, as part of sending/receiving relationships with the Belvidere School District. As of the 2021–22 school year, the high school had an enrollment of 357 students and 32.3 classroom teachers (on an FTE basis), for a student–teacher ratio of 11.1:1.

Students from the township and from all of Warren County are eligible to attend Ridge and Valley Charter School in Frelinghuysen Township (for grades K–8) or Warren County Technical School in Washington borough (for 9–12), with special education services provided by local districts supplemented throughout the county by the Warren County Special Services School District in Oxford Township (for PreK–12).

Transportation

The only major road that traverses Harmony is CR 519, which leads to U.S. Route 22 to the south and U.S. Route 46 to the north.

The closest limited access road is Interstate 78 which is in neighboring Greenwich and Franklin.

Notable people

People who were born in, residents of, or otherwise closely associated with Harmony Township include:

 Elena Seiple (born 1973), bodybuilder and strongwoman
 Robert A. Seiple (born 1942), non-profit executive, former military officer, university administrator, and diplomat, who served as the first United States Ambassador-at-Large for International Religious Freedom

References

External links

Harmony Township website

Surrounding communities

 
1839 establishments in New Jersey
New Jersey populated places on the Delaware River
Populated places established in 1839
Township form of New Jersey government
Townships in Warren County, New Jersey